This is a list of equipment of the Republic of Singapore Navy, the naval service branch of the Singapore Armed Forces (SAF). It is subdivided into vessels, aircraft, and weapons.

Vessels

Submarines

Ships

Aircraft

Weapons

Ship/submarine missiles

See also
 List of equipment of the Singapore Army
 List of equipment of the Republic of Singapore Air Force

References

Republic of Singapore Navy
Singapore Navy